The 2021 Youngstown State Penguins baseball team was a baseball team that represented Youngstown State University in the 2021 NCAA Division I baseball season. The Penguins were members of the Horizon League and played their home games at Eastwood Field in Niles, Ohio. They were led by fifth-year head coach Dan Bertolini.

Previous season
The Penguins finished the 2020 NCAA Division I baseball season 7–7 overall (0–0 conference) and first place in conference standings, but the season was cut short in stages by March 17, 2020 due to the COVID-19 pandemic.

Preseason Horizon poll
For the 2021 poll, Youngstown State was projected to finish in third in the Conference.

Roster

Schedule

! style="" | Regular Season
|- valign="top" 

|- bgcolor="#ffcccc"
| 1 || February 19 || at Troy || Riddle–Pace Field • Troy, Alabama || 4–10 || Ortiz (1–0) || Clark (0–1) || None || 959 || 0–1 || –
|- bgcolor="#ffcccc"
| 2 || February 20 || at Troy || Riddle–Pace Field • Troy, Alabama || 2–8 || Gainous (1–0) || Floyd (0–1) || Oates (1) || 1,002 || 0–2 || –
|- bgcolor="#ffcccc"
| 3 || February 20 || at Troy || Riddle–Pace Field • Troy, Alabama || 6–13 || Witcher (1–0) || Perry (0–1) || None || 1,002 || 0–3 || –
|- bgcolor="#ccffcc"
| 4 || February 21 || at Troy || Riddle–Pace Field • Troy, Alabama || 4–2 || Snyder (1–0) || Wilkinson (0–1) || Clift Jr. (1) || 801 || 1–3 || –
|- bgcolor="#ffcccc"
| 5 || February 26 || at Nicholls || Ben Meyer Diamond at Ray E. Didier Field • Thibodaux, Louisiana || 6–7 || Desandro (1–0) || Brosky (0–1) || Taylor (1) || 547 || 1–4 || –
|- bgcolor="#ffcccc"
| 6 || February 26 || at LSU || Alex Box Stadium, Skip Bertman Field • Baton Rouge, Louisiana || 2–6 || Hill (2–0) || Clark (0–2) || Fontenot (1) || 2,251 || 1–5 || –
|- bgcolor="#ffcccc"
| 7 || February 27 || at LSU || Alex Box Stadium, Skip Bertman Field • Baton Rouge, Louisiana || 3–5 || Brady (1–0) || Clift Jr. (0–1) || None || 2,578 || 1–6 || –
|- bgcolor="#ccffcc"
| 8 || February 28 || at Nicholls || Ben Meyer Diamond at Ray E. Didier Field • Thibodaux, Louisiana || 7–4 || Ball (1–0) || Heckman (0–1) || Clift Jr. (2) || 737 || 2–6 || –
|-

|- bgcolor="#ccffcc"
| 9 || March 5 || vs Purdue Fort Wayne || Defiance High School • Defiance, Ohio || 6–3 ||Clark (1–2) || Miller (1–1) || Clift Jr. (3) || 0 || 3–6 || 1–0
|- bgcolor="#ccffcc"
| 10 || March 6 || vs Purdue Fort Wayne || Defiance High School • Defiance, Ohio || 3–0 || Floyd (1–1) || Boyd (0–2) || None || 0 || 4–6 || 2–0
|- bgcolor="#ffcccc"
| 11 || March 7 || vs Purdue Fort Wayne || Defiance High School • Defiance, Ohio || 0–1 || Myer (1–0) || Cole (0–1) || None || 0 || 4–7 || 2–1
|- bgcolor="#ccffcc"
| 12 || March 7 || vs Purdue Fort Wayne || Defiance High School • Defiance, Ohio || 13–8 || Perez (1–0) || Madura (0–2) || None || 0 || 5–7 || 3–1
|- bgcolor="#ffcccc"
| 13 || March 12 || at Wright State || Nischwitz Stadium • Dayton, Ohio || 2–12 || Schrand (2–2) || Clark (1–3) || None || 156 || 5–8 || 3–2
|- bgcolor="#ffcccc"
| 14 || March 13 || at Wright State || Nischwitz Stadium • Dayton, Ohio || 1–2 || Brehmer (2–1) || Floyd (1–2) || None || 148 || 5–9 || 3–3
|- bgcolor="#ffcccc"
| 15 || March 13 || at Wright State || Nischwitz Stadium • Dayton, Ohio || 5–14 || Wirsing (2–1) || Perez (1–1) ||None || 146 || 5–10 || 3–4
|- bgcolor="#ffcccc"
| 16 || March 14 || at Wright State || Nischwitz Stadium • Dayton, Ohio || 1–6 ||  Cline (2–1) || Snyder (1–1) || None || 158 || 5–11 || 3–5
|- bgcolor="#ccffcc"
| 19 || March 20 ||  || Eastwood Field • Niles, Ohio || 6–4 || Floyd (2–2) || Baez (0–1) || Clift Jr. (4) || 0 || 6–11 || 3–5
|- bgcolor="#ccffcc"
| 20 || March 20 || St. Bonaventure || Eastwood Field • Niles, Ohio || 7–1 || Misik (1–0) || Breen (0–1) || None || 391 || 7–11 || 3–5
|- bgcolor="#ccffcc"
| 21 || March 21 || St. Bonaventure || Eastwood Field • Niles, Ohio || 22–6 || Snyder (2–1) || White (0–1) || None || 200 || 8–11 || 3–5
|- bgcolor="#ccffcc"
| 22 || March 26 || Wright State || Eastwood Field • Niles, Ohio || 12–10 || Clark (2–3) || Schrand (2–3) || Clift Jr. (5) || 304 || 9–11 || 4–5
|- bgcolor="#ccffcc"
| 23 || March 27 || Wright State || Eastwood Field • Niles, Ohio || 4–0 || Floyd (3–2) || Brehmer (3–2) || None || 329 || 10–11 || 5–5
|- bgcolor="#ffcccc"
| 24 || March 27 || Wright State || Eastwood Field • Niles, Ohio || 8–20 || Cline (4–1) || Snyder (2–2) || None || 329 || 10–12 || 5–6
|- bgcolor="#ccffcc"
| 25 || March 28 || Wright State || Eastwood Field • Niles, Ohio || 11–10 || Clift Jr. (1–1) || Greenwell (0–1) || None || 103 || 11–12 || 6–6
|-

|- bgcolor="#ccffcc"
| 26 || April 1 ||  || Eastwood Field • Niles, Ohio || 2–1 || Floyd (4–2) || Key (2–2) || None || 203 || 12–12 || 7–6
|- bgcolor="#ffcccc"
| 27 || April 2 || UIC || Eastwood Field • Niles, Ohio || 0–6 || Lopez (2–2) || Clark (2–4) || None || 203 || 12–13 || 7–7
|- bgcolor="#ccffcc"
| 28 || April 2 || UIC || Eastwood Field • Niles, Ohio || 15–10 || Snyder (3–2) || O'Reilly (1–4) || None || 284 || 13–13 || 8–7
|- bgcolor="#ccffcc"
| 29 || April 3 || UIC || Eastwood Field • Niles, Ohio || 14–9 || Perez (2–1) || Shears (0–5) || None || 284 || 14–13 || 9–7
|- bgcolor="#ccffcc"
| 30 || April 9 || at  || Routine Field • Franklin, Wisconsin || 2–1 || Floyd (5–2) || Frey (1–3) || None || 289 || 15–13 || 10–7
|- bgcolor="#ccffcc"
| 31 || April 10 || at Milwaukee || Routine Field • Franklin, Wisconsin || 7–4 || Clark (3–4) || Mahoney (2–4) || Clift Jr. (6) || 289 || 16–13 || 11–7
|- bgcolor="#ffcccc"
| 32 || April 10 || at Milwaukee || Routine Field • Franklin, Wisconsin || 6–7 || Armstrong (1–0) || Earich (0–1) || Blubaugh (4) || 238 || 16–14 || 11–8
|- bgcolor="#ccffcc"
| 33 || April 11 || at Milwaukee || Routine Field • Franklin, Wisconsin || 8–12 || Blubaugh (1–1) || Clift Jr. (1–2) || None || 327 || 16–15 || 11–9
|- bgcolor="#ffcccc"
| 34 || April 16 || at  || Bill Aker Baseball Complex • Highland Heights, Kentucky || 7–9 || Gerl (3–3) || Clark (5–3) || Meeks (1) || 85 || 16–16 || 11–10
|- bgcolor="#ccffcc"
| 35 || April 17 || at Northern Kentucky || Bill Aker Baseball Complex • Highland Heights, Kentucky || 1–0 || Floyd (6–2) || Klingenbeck (2–4) || None || – || 17–16 || 12–10
|- bgcolor="#ffcccc"
| 36 || April 17 || at Northern Kentucky || Bill Aker Baseball Complex • Highland Heights, Kentucky || 2–7 || Richardson (2–0) || Perez (2–2) || None || – || 17–17 || 12–11
|- bgcolor="#ccffcc"
| 37 || April 18 || at Northern Kentucky || Bill Aker Baseball Complex • Highland Heights, Kentucky || 18–6 || Snyder (4–2) || Bohlen (0–1) || None || 113 || 18–17 || 13–11
|- bgcolor="#ccffcc"
| 38 || April 23 ||  || Eastwood Field • Niles, Ohio || 4–3 || Hake (1–0) || Deans (3–3) || None || 229 || 19–17 || 14–11
|- bgcolor="#ccffcc"
| 39 || April 24 || Oakland || Eastwood Field • Niles, Ohio || 12–6 || Coles (1–1) || Nierman (1–3) || None || 229 || 20–17 || 15–11
|- bgcolor="#ccffcc"
| 40 || April 24 || Oakland || Eastwood Field • Niles, Ohio || 4–3 || Clift Jr. (2–2) || Nierman (1–4) || None || 301 || 21–17 || 16–11
|- bgcolor="#ccffcc"
| 41 || April 25 || Oakland || Eastwood Field • Niles, Ohio || 18–6 || Perez (3–2) || Deans (3–4) || None || 213 || 22–17 || 17–11
|- bgcolor="#ccffcc"
| 42 || April 30 || at UIC || Les Miller Field at Curtis Granderson Stadium • Chicago, Illinois || 1–0 || Clark (4–5) || Key (5–3) || Clift Jr. (7) || 77 || 23–17 || 18–11
|-

|- bgcolor="#ffcccc"
| 43 || May 1 || at UIC || Les Miller Field at Curtis Granderson Stadium • Chicago, Illinois || 1–3 || Torres (5–1) || Floyd (6–3) || Gosbeth (3) || 83 || 23–18 || 18–12
|- bgcolor="#ffcccc"
| 44 || May 1 || at UIC || Les Miller Field at Curtis Granderson Stadium • Chicago, Illinois || 7–8 || McCabe (1–0) || Coles (1–2) || None || 103 || 23–19 || 18–13
|- bgcolor="#ffcccc"
| 45 || May 2 || at UIC || Les Miller Field at Curtis Granderson Stadium • Chicago, Illinois || 7–18 || Shears (1–5) || Hake (1–1) || None || 124 || 23–20 || 18–14
|- bgcolor="#ccffcc"
| 46 || May 7 || Purdue Fort Wayne || Eastwood Field • Niles, Ohio || 6–2 || Floyd (7–3) || Fee (0–3) || None || 219 || 24–20 || 19–14
|- bgcolor="#ccffcc"
| 47 || May 7 || Purdue Fort Wayne || Eastwood Field • Niles, Ohio || 15–4 || Clark (5–5) || Pintarich (1–5) || None || 219 || 25–20 || 20–14
|- bgcolor="#ffcccc"
| 48 || May 8 || Purdue Fort Wayne || Eastwood Field • Niles, Ohio || 1–3 || Miller (4–6) || Clift Jr. (2–3) || Boyd (1) || 218 || 25–21 || 20–15
|- bgcolor="#ccffcc"
| 49 || May 8 || Purdue Fort Wayne || Eastwood Field • Niles, Ohio || 7–5 || Coles (2–2) || Boyd (0–6) || None || 218 || 26–21 || 21–15
|- bgcolor="#ccffcc"
| 50 || May 14 || at  || Knights Field • Louisville, Kentucky || 11–3 || Clark (6–5) || Pender (2–5) || None || 50 || 27–21 || 21–15
|- bgcolor="#ccffcc"
| 51 || May 15 || at Bellarmine || Knights Field • Louisville, Kentucky || 11–6 || Floyd (8–3) || Nagel (2–4) || None || 100 || 28–21 || 21–15
|- bgcolor="#ccffcc"
| 52 || May 16 || at Bellarmine || Knights Field • Louisville, Kentucky || 5–1 || Snyder (5–2) || Davis (0–6) || Clift Jr. (8) || 50 || 29–21 || 21–15
|- bgcolor="#ccffcc"
| 53 || May 21 || Milwaukee || Eastwood Field • Niles, Ohio || 3–2 || Floyd (9–3) || Frey (2–8) || Clark (1) || 370 || 30–21 || 22–15
|- bgcolor="#ccffcc"
| 54 || May 22 || Milwaukee || Eastwood Field • Niles, Ohio || 9–4 || Snyder (6–2) || Edwards (2–7) || Hake (1) || 488 || 31–21 || 23–15
|- bgcolor="#ffcccc"
| 55 || May 21 || Milwaukee || Eastwood Field • Niles, Ohio || 12–14 || Severson (1–0) || Perez (3–3) || None || 488 || 31–22 || 23–16
|- bgcolor="#ccffcc"
| 56 || May 23 || Milwaukee || Eastwood Field • Niles, Ohio || 10–2 || Perry (1–1) || Neu (3–3) || None || 431 || 32–22 || 24–16
|-

|-
! style="" | Postseason
|- valign="top" 

|- bgcolor="#ffcccc"
| 57 || May 27 || vs UIC || Nischwitz Stadium • Dayton, Ohio || 4–7 || Key (7–3) || Clark (6–6) || Gosbeth (7) || 178 || 32–23 || 24–16
|- bgcolor="#ffcccc"
| 58 || May 27 || vs Milwaukee || Nischwitz Stadium • Dayton, Ohio || 6–9 || Mahoney (5–6) || Floyd' (9–4) || Blubaugh (8) || 154 || 32–24 || 24–16
|-

Awards and honors

Horizon League Players of the Week

References

Youngstown State
Youngstown State Penguins baseball seasons
Youngstown State Penguins